Hem Thon Vitiny (born 7 September 1993 in Phnom Penh, Cambodia) is a Cambodian swimmer. She competed at the 2012 Summer Olympics in the 50 m freestyle event and finished with a rank of 57 in the first round. Vitiny did not advance to the semifinals.

References

External links
 

Living people
1993 births
Swimmers at the 2008 Summer Olympics
Swimmers at the 2012 Summer Olympics
Swimmers at the 2016 Summer Olympics
Olympic swimmers of Cambodia
Sportspeople from Phnom Penh
Swimmers at the 2006 Asian Games
Swimmers at the 2010 Asian Games
Swimmers at the 2014 Asian Games
Cambodian female freestyle swimmers
Asian Games competitors for Cambodia
20th-century Cambodian women
21st-century Cambodian women